The Diary of Ma Yan: The Struggles and Hopes of a Chinese School Girl (马燕日记) is the diary of Chinese schoolgirl Ma Yan (马燕) from a remote village in Hunan province, China.

In March 2001, Pierre Haski, a French journalist was filming a documentary on Chinese Muslims. Haski arrived in the extremely remote rural village of Zhangjiashu (in the northwestern region of Ningxia, Hunan province) and stayed for a few days in the village imam's modest hut. There, Haski and his team were treated well  by the impoverished villagers, although found facilities such as drinking water and education were very poor.

As they were leaving, the mother of thirteen-year-old Ma Yan thrust her daughter's handwritten diaries into the arms of Haski and his team,pleading with them to help her. Back in Shanghai, the team were moved by the words in the diaries in which Ma Yan described her desire to continue to attend school and help her family. Being desperately poor, the Ma family had already pulled Ma Yan out of school as the fees were too expensive for Ma Yan's family to afford. 

Ma Yans diaries were edited and initially published in France by Haski. 

In the summer of 2002, a fund known as the Children of Ningxia was set up to send Ma Yan and children like her to school. Since then, the diary has been published in seventeen languages and sold over 200,000  copies worldwide.

Later Ma Yan said “I want to study journalism at university,” citing her motivation as “Because Uncle Han (Mr Haski) and others traveled across the country and found poor children, like us. I'd like to be a journalist so I, too, can help poor children.” 

Through Children of Ningxia around 250 Chinese schoolchildren have been able to access or continue their education. Ma Yan’s village have also benefited, with better access to freshwater and agricultural fertilizers.

References

Ma, Yan, and Pierre Haski (2005). The Diary of Ma Yan: The Struggles and Hopes of a Chinese Schoolgirl. HarperCollins. . .

External links
Children of Ningxia (English version)
Enfants du Ningxia (French version)
New York Times article 

Diaries
2001 non-fiction books
History of Ningxia